The Avon River is a river in Western Australia.

Avon catchment area

The basin covers much of the Western Australian wheatbelt and extends beyond that in some areas near almost-always-dry Lake Moore in the northeast, water is received regularly from only the extreme western edge of the basin. Indeed, until an abnormally wet year in 1963 it was not realised that the northeastern part of the basin beyond Wongan Hills ever drained water into the river. Under present climatic conditions, it is almost impossible to produce runoff from anywhere outside the extreme west of the basin because the amount of rain required to fall before runoff would begin is as high or higher than the mean annual rainfall. The river has three main sub-catchments: catchments for the Mortlock, Yilgarn, and Lockhart rivers.

The river flows past County Peak, creating a picturesque view from the top.

Course and features
Thirty creeks and rivers flow into the Avon; some of the larger tributaries include the Dale River, Brockman River, Mortlock River and the Mackie River. Most of these watercourses are ephemeral and only flow after rain in winter and spring.

Some permanent pools exist along the course of the river including Burlong Pool, Robins Pool, Long Pool, Cobblers Pool and Jimperding Pool.

The Avon River Valley is the third and final route for the Eastern Railway line through the Darling Scarp between Midland and Northam, having been constructed in the 1960s.

It is the site of an annual whitewater boating event, the Avon Descent.

Soils
Due to the extraordinary age of the soils in the basin (which is on the extremely ancient Yilgarn Craton), the rooting density of native flora is very high and its average specific discharge probably the lowest of any basin of comparable size in the world. The extreme age of the soils also means that, at least after clearing for agriculture, almost all rivers in the basin have salinities above 0.3% (one tenth that of the oceans and eight times that necessary to qualify as "fresh" water) and some much more than that.

Passing through some of the oldest settled European agricultural areas in Western Australia, the catchment area has extensive soil salinity issues, which have attracted governmental programmes to alleviate the loss of agricultural lands.  Catchment groups that oversee projects in the tributary parts of the river have had considerable support and funding from commercial and non-governmental sources as well.

See also

 List of watercourses in Western Australia

References

Further reading
 Harris, T. F. W. (1996) The Avon : an introduction Perth, W.A.: Water and Rivers Commission

External links
 http://www.wheatbeltnrm.org.au/ – formerly the Avon Catchment Council – known now as the Wheatbelt Natural Resource Management Inc.

 
Swan River (Western Australia)